In mathematics, specifically bifurcation theory, the Feigenbaum constants  are two mathematical constants which both express ratios in a bifurcation diagram for a non-linear map. They are named after the physicist Mitchell J. Feigenbaum.

History
Feigenbaum originally related the first constant to the period-doubling bifurcations in the logistic map, but also showed it to hold for all one-dimensional maps with a single quadratic maximum. As a consequence of this generality, every chaotic system that corresponds to this description will bifurcate at the same rate. Feigenbaum made this discovery in 1975, and he officially published it in 1978.

The first constant
The first Feigenbaum constant   is the limiting ratio of each bifurcation interval to the next between every period doubling, of a one-parameter map

where  is a function parameterized by the bifurcation parameter .

It is given by the limit

Names
 Feigenbaum Constant
 Feigenbaum bifurcation velocity
 delta

Value
 30 decimal places :  = 
 
 A simple rational approximation is: , which is correct to 5 significant values (when rounding). For more precision use , which is correct to 7 significant values.

Illustration

Non-linear maps
To see how this number arises, consider the real one-parameter map

Here  is the bifurcation parameter,  is the variable. These are tabulated below:

{| class="wikitable"
|-
! 
! Period
! Bifurcation parameter
! Ratio 
|-
| 1
|| 2
|| 0.75
|| —
|-
| 2
|| 4
|| 1.25
|| —
|-
| 3
|| 8
|| 
|| 4.2337
|-
| 4
|| 16
|| 
|| 4.5515
|-
| 5
|| 32
|| 
|| 4.6458
|-
| 6
|| 64
|| 
|| 4.6639
|-
| 7
|| 128
|| 
|| 4.6682
|-
| 8
|| 256
|| 
|| 4.6689
|-
|}

The ratio in the last column converges to the first Feigenbaum constant. The same number arises for the logistic map

with real parameter  and variable . Tabulating the bifurcation values again:

{| class="wikitable"
|-
! 
! Period
! Bifurcation parameter
! Ratio 
|-
| 1
|| 2
|| 3
|| —
|-
| 2
|| 4
|| 
|| —
|-
| 3
|| 8
|| 
|| 4.7514
|-
| 4
|| 16
|| 
|| 4.6562
|-
| 5
|| 32
|| 
|| 4.6683
|-
| 6
|| 64
|| 
|| 4.6686
|-
| 7
|| 128
|| 
|| 4.6692
|-
| 8
|| 256
|| 
|| 4.6694
|-
|}

Fractals

In the case of the Mandelbrot set for complex quadratic polynomial

the Feigenbaum constant is the ratio between the diameters of successive circles on the real axis in the complex plane (see animation on the right).

{| class="wikitable"
|-
! 
! Period = 
! Bifurcation parameter
! Ratio 
|-
| 1
|| 2
|| 
|| —
|-
| 2
|| 4
|| 
|| —
|-
| 3
|| 8
|| 
|| 4.2337
|-
| 4
|| 16
|| 
|| 4.5515
|-
| 5
|| 32
|| 
|| 4.6458
|-
| 6
|| 64
|| 
|| 4.6639
|-
| 7
|| 128
|| 
|| 4.6682
|-
| 8
|| 256
|| 
|| 4.6689
|-
|9
||512
||
||
|-
|10
||1024
||
||
|-
|
||
|| … 
||
|}

Bifurcation parameter is a root point of period- component. This series converges to the Feigenbaum point  = −1.401155...... The ratio in the last column converges to the first Feigenbaum constant.

The second constant
The second Feigenbaum constant or Feigenbaum's alpha constant ,

is the ratio between the width of a tine and the width of one of its two subtines (except the tine closest to the fold). A negative sign is applied to  when the ratio between the lower subtine and the width of the tine is measured.

These numbers apply to a large class of dynamical systems (for example, dripping faucets to population growth).

A simple rational approximation is  ×  ×  = .

Properties
Both numbers are believed to be transcendental, although they have not been proven to be so. There is also no known proof that either constant is irrational.

The first proof of the universality of the Feigenbaum constants was carried out by Oscar Lanford—with computer-assistance—in 1982 (with a small correction by Jean-Pierre Eckmann and Peter Wittwer of the University of Geneva in 1987).  Over the years, non-numerical methods were discovered for different parts of the proof, aiding Mikhail Lyubich in producing the first complete non-numerical proof.

See also

 Bifurcation diagram
 Bifurcation theory
 Cascading failure
 Feigenbaum function
 List of chaotic maps

Notes

References
 Alligood, Kathleen T.,  Tim D. Sauer, James A. Yorke, Chaos: An Introduction to Dynamical Systems, Textbooks in mathematical sciences Springer, 1996,

External links
 Feigenbaum Constant – from Wolfram MathWorld
 
 
 
 Feigenbaum constant  – PlanetMath
 
 

Dynamical systems
Mathematical constants
Bifurcation theory
Chaos theory